Cardinal Stadium is a 3,500-seat multi-purpose stadium in Washington, D.C. The stadium is located on the campus of the Catholic University of America, and is home to the Catholic University Cardinals football, field hockey, lacrosse, and track and field teams. For the pandemic-shortened 2020 season, it was the home of Old Glory DC of Major League Rugby.

Cardinal Stadium opened in 1985 after Brookland Stadium was closed down. Cardinal Stadium is a 15-minute walk from the Brookland–CUA Station on the Washington Metro Red Line.

The stadium has a synthetic FieldTurf surface, installed in 2006 and renewed in 2016, and a Daktronics scoreboard, installed in 2007. Bleachers are located on the eastern side of the stadium, and are separated from the playing field by an eight-lane track.

References

American football venues in Washington, D.C.
Athletics (track and field) venues in Washington, D.C.
Catholic University Cardinals
Catholic University Cardinals football
College field hockey venues in the United States
College football venues
College lacrosse venues in the United States
College track and field venues in the United States
Lacrosse venues in Washington, D.C.
Major League Rugby stadiums
Old Glory DC
Sports venues completed in 1985
Ultimate (sport) venues
1985 establishments in Washington, D.C.